Young Blues is the second album led by jazz organist Larry Young which was recorded in 1960 and released on the New Jazz label.

Reception

The Allmusic site awarded the album 4½ stars and stated "the best from his early period before he completely shook off the influence of Jimmy Smith... Recommended as a good example of his pre-Blue Note work."

Track listing 
All compositions by Larry Young except as indicated
 "Young Blues" - 6:28   
 "A Midnight Angel" (Morris Bailey) - 2:24   
 "African Blues" - 4:55   
 "Little White Lies" (Walter Donaldson) - 4:15   
 "Minor Dream" (Ray Draper) - 5:03   
 "Something New/Something Blue" - 7:25   
 "Nica's Dream" (Horace Silver) - 6:39

Personnel 
Larry Young - organ 
Thornel Schwartz - guitar 
Wendell Marshall - bass
Jimmie Smith - drums

References 

Larry Young (musician) albums
1960 albums
New Jazz Records albums
Albums recorded at Van Gelder Studio
Albums produced by Esmond Edwards